For the 25th Eurovision Song Contest, the Swedish entry was chosen in the national selection Melodifestivalen 1980. Tomas Ledin won with the song "Just nu!", which he had written himself.

Before Eurovision

Melodifestivalen 1980 
Melodifestivalen 1980 was the selection for the 20th song to represent Sweden at the Eurovision Song Contest. It was the 19th time that this system of picking a song had been used. 120 songs were submitted to SVT for the competition. The final was held in the SVT Studios in Stockholm on 8 March 1980, presented by Bengt Bedrup and broadcast on TV1 but was not broadcast on radio.

Voting

At Eurovision
At the final in The Hague, he came 10th (out of 19) with 47 points. He had the draw number #8. As of 2021, this is the most recent occasion on which Sweden has failed to score any points from the other participating Nordic nations (and, in turn, it is the most recent contest final to see the Swedish jury fail to award any points to another Nordic nation, save for  when Sweden was the only Nordic nation in the final).

Voting

References

External links
TV broadcastings at SVT's open archive

1980
Countries in the Eurovision Song Contest 1980
1980
Eurovision
Eurovision